
Gmina Brzesko is an urban-rural gmina (administrative district) in Brzesko County, Lesser Poland Voivodeship, in southern Poland.

Villages
Apart from the town of Brzesko, Gmina Brzesko contains the villages and settlements of Bucze, Jadowniki, Jasień, Mokrzyska, Okocim, Poręba Spytkowska, Sterkowiec, Szczepanów and Wokowice.

Neighbouring gminas
Gmina Brzesko is bordered by the gminas of Bochnia, Borzęcin, Dębno, Gnojnik, Nowy Wiśnicz, Rzezawa and Szczurowa.

References
Polish official population figures 2006

Brzesko
Brzesko County